Willard R. Hansen (born March 11, 1931) is an American politician in the state of Iowa.

Hansen was born in Cedar Falls, Iowa. He attended Dana College and was an insurance executive and realtor. He was former president of Cedar Falls Chamber of Commerce. He appeared in 1955 edition Outstanding Young Men of America. In addition to that he won the Recipient Jaycee Distinguished Service Award in 1962, Distinguished Service Award from Cedar Falls Education Association and Phi Beta Lambida in 1972, and University of Northern Iowa Alumni Service Award in 1973. He served in the Iowa State Senate from 1973 to 1981, and Iowa House of Representatives from 1969 to 1973 as a Republican.

References

1931 births
Living people
People from Cedar Falls, Iowa
Dana College alumni
Businesspeople from Iowa
Republican Party Iowa state senators
Republican Party members of the Iowa House of Representatives